Leon R. Rohde (born 10 May 1995) is a German road and track cyclist, who currently rides for UCI Continental team .

Major results

2011
 1st  Road race, National Novice Road Championships
 National Novice Track Championships
1st  Madison
1st  Team pursuit
 3rd Criterium, European Youth Summer Olympic Festival
2012
 3rd Team pursuit, UEC European Junior Track Championships
2013
 National Junior Track Championships
1st  Individual pursuit
1st  Team pursuit
 2nd Road race, National Junior Road Championships
 3rd Omnium, National Track Championships
2014
 UEC European Under-23 Track Championships
1st  Madison (with Domenic Weinstein)
3rd Team pursuit
 1st  Points race, National Track Championships
2015
 1st Madison, 2015–16 UCI Track Cycling World Cup, Cali (with Kersten Thiele)
 National Track Championships
2nd Individual pursuit
3rd Team pursuit
2016
 3rd Team time trial, National Road Championships
 3rd Individual pursuit, National Track Championships
2017
 7th Overall Le Triptyque des Monts et Châteaux
2018
 National Track Championships
1st  Scratch
3rd Team pursuit
 3rd Team time trial, National Road Championships
2019
 1st  Team pursuit, National Track Championships (with Felix Groß, Theo Reinhardt and Nils Schomber)

References

External links

1995 births
Living people
German male cyclists
Olympic cyclists of Germany
Cyclists at the 2020 Summer Olympics
People from Altona, Hamburg
Cyclists from Hamburg